Clive Cruickshanks (22 October 1908 – 22 January 1994) was a South African cricketer. He played in seven first-class matches for Eastern Province from 1931/32 to 1934/35.

See also
 List of Eastern Province representative cricketers

References

External links
 

1908 births
1994 deaths
South African cricketers
Eastern Province cricketers
Cricketers from Port Elizabeth